Patiabad may refer to:
 Patiabad, Kermanshah
 Patiabad, Mahidasht, Kermanshah Province